Acrobasis eburnella is a species of snout moth in the genus Acrobasis. It was described by Hans Georg Amsel in 1954. It is found in Iran.

References

Moths described in 1954
Acrobasis
Moths of Asia